The Pran Buri Forest Park is a protected area in Thailand. It is at the mouth of the Pran Buri River to the Gulf of Thailand in Pran Buri District, Prachuap Khiri Khan Province. 

Pran Buri Forest Park was founded either in 1974 or on 30 September 1982 by the Forestry Department after Queen Sirikit visited Pak Nam Pran Buri Village in Pran Buri and was inspired to support the growing of more trees along the coastline. This project developed 1,984 rai of Khlong Kao and Khlong Doi forests, consisting of mangrove forests, mixed deciduous forests, and coastal plains.

The park protects the mangrove forest of the Khlong Kao-Khlong Kop National Reserve Forest.

References

Forest parks of Thailand
Protected areas established in 1982
Geography of Prachuap Khiri Khan province
Tourist attractions in Prachuap Khiri Khan province
1982 establishments in Thailand